Lone Tree Township is one of eleven townships in Merrick County, Nebraska, United States. The population was 627 at the 2020 census. A 2021 estimate placed the township's population at 626.

History
Lone Tree Township takes its name from a large cottonwood tree that was a local landmark on the prairie until it was toppled in a storm in 1865.

See also
 County government in Nebraska

References

External links
 City-Data.com

Townships in Merrick County, Nebraska
Townships in Nebraska